Richard Scroope was a Bishop of Carlisle. He was selected 1 February 1464, and consecrated 24 June 1464. He died 10 May 1468.

Notes

Citations

References
 

Bishops of Carlisle
1468 deaths
15th-century English Roman Catholic bishops
Year of birth unknown